Alder is the common name of Alnus, a genus of shrubs and small trees.

Alder may also refer to:

People 
 Alder (surname)

Places 
 Alder, Colorado
 Alder, Montana, United States
 Alder, Oregon, United States
 Alder, Washington, United States
 Alders Brook, a small tributary of the River Roding
 Alder Creek (disambiguation)
 Alder River, Nova Scotia, Canada
 Des Aulnes River (Laflamme River) (English: Alders River), Quebec, Canada

Other uses 
 Alder (crater), lunar crater
 Alder (Pendragon series), a fictional character in The Pendragon Adventure
 Dwarf alder (disambiguation), common name of several plants
 Witch alder, plants of genus Fothergilla
 A shortened form of Aldernalisuvara, an alternative name of the Hindu deity Ardhanari particularly used by Japanese
 Alder (Pokémon), the champion of the Unova League in Pokémon Black and White
 Alders (surname)

See also 
 Alda (disambiguation)
 Elder (disambiguation)